Senator Person may refer to:

Curtis S. Person Jr. (1934–2020), Tennessee State Senate
Seymour H. Person (1879–1957), Michigan State Senate